1-Phenylethanol is the organic compound with the formula C6H5CH(OH)CH3. It is one of the most commonly available chiral alcohols. It is a colorless liquid with a mild gardenia-hyacinth scent.

Natural occurrence 
1-Phenylethanol is found in nature as a glycoside, together with its hydrolase β-primeverosidase in tea (Camellia sinensis) flowers. It is also reportedly present in cranberries, grapes, chives, Scottish spearmint oil, cheeses, cognac, rum, white wine, cocoa, black tea, filbert, cloudberries, beans, mushrooms, and endives.

Synthesis 
Racemic 1-phenylethanol is produced by the reduction of acetophenone by sodium borohydride. Alternatively, benzaldehyde can be reacted with methylmagnesium chloride or similar organometallic compounds to afford racemic 1-phenylethanol.

Asymmetric hydrogenation of acetophenone by Noyori catalysts proceeds quantitatively (50 atm H2, room temperature, minutes) in >99% e.e.

See also
 2-Phenylethanol, achiral isomer of 1-phenylethanol.

References 

Secondary alcohols
Phenyl compounds